The Setouchi International Art Triennale is a contemporary art festival held every three years on several islands in the Seto Inland Sea of Japan and the coastal cities of Takamatsu and Tamano. The festival was inaugurated in 2010 with the aim of revitalizing the Seto Inland Sea area, which has suffered from depopulation in recent years. The festival features over 150 artworks by artists from both Japan and overseas, many of whom make use of abandoned homes to host or even become their art installations.
The Triennale lasts for eight months with three main sessions; the spring session runs from March to mid-April, the summer session runs from mid-July to early September, and the autumn session runs from October to early November.

While several of the museums and installations are permanent exhibitions, many of the smaller islands offer temporary exhibitions limited to a single session.

Participating Islands and Cities
Each year, the following 12 islands and two coastal cities participate in the Triennale.

Resources

References

External links
 Setouchi Art Festival

Art festivals in Japan
Japanese contemporary art